The Naked Zoo is a 1970 American exploitation film directed by William Grefé and starring Rita Hayworth, Stephen Oliver, and Fay Spain. Its plot follows a seductive, older Miami housewife who begins an affair with a young author, triggering a violent response from her wealthy, paraplegic husband.

Cast

Production
Filming took place in Miami and Fort Lauderdale, Florida.

Reception
Rose Thompson of the Radio Times panned the film, deeming it a "sleazy drama" that "wasn't exactly a highlight of Rita Hayworth's career."

References

External links

1970 films
American exploitation films
American thriller films
Films about infidelity
Films set in Miami
Films shot in Miami
Psychedelic films
1970s English-language films
Films directed by William Grefe
1970s American films